The 1973 Colorado State Rams football team represented Colorado State University in the Western Athletic Conference during the 1973 NCAA Division I football season. In their first season under head coach Sark Arslanian, the Rams compiled a 5–6 record.

Schedule

References

Colorado State
Colorado State Rams football seasons
Colorado State Rams football